Deffner is a surname. Notable people with the surname include:

Michael Deffner (1848–1934), German classical philologist and linguist
Karl Deffner (1817–1877),  German manufacturer, politician and geologist
Sebastian Deffner, German theoretical physicist and a professor in the Department of Physics at the University of Maryland